Nat King Cole Sings My Fair Lady is a 1963 album by Nat King Cole of songs from the 1956 musical My Fair Lady.

Track listing 
 "With a Little Bit of Luck" – 2:52
 "I Could Have Danced All Night" – 2:30
 "The Rain in Spain" – 3:26
 "On the Street Where You Live" – 3:12
 "I'm an Ordinary Man" – 5:14
 "Get Me to the Church on Time" – 2:30
 "Show Me" – 3:37
 "I've Grown Accustomed to Her Face" – 2:48
 "You Did It" – 4:09
 "Wouldn't It Be Loverly" – 2:51
 "A Hymn to Him" – 3:10

All music by Frederick Loewe, and all lyrics by Alan Jay Lerner.

Personnel

Performance 
 Nat King Cole – vocal
 Ralph Carmichael – arranger, conductor

References 

1963 albums
Nat King Cole albums
Albums arranged by Ralph Carmichael
Capitol Records albums
Albums conducted by Ralph Carmichael